Barry Lee Houser (born June 21, 1977) is an American musician and conductor who is the current director of the University of Illinois Marching Illini. Houser is also the current Associate Director of Bands and Director of Athletic Bands at the University of Illinois at Urbana-Champaign. Along with serving as the director of the Marching Illini, his duties include conducting the Illinois Wind Orchestra, the basketball and volleyball bands, while also teaching other courses in the School of Music.

Houser is often called upon to serve as an ambassador for the University.  He is also known for being knowledgeable on the history of the University of Illinois Bands and is an advocate for furthering the program’s legacy of innovation.

Bands under Houser's direction have performed at events at the national and local level, ranging from the Macy’s Thanksgiving Day Parade and the NBC Today Show to the ISSMA State Marching Finals and the IMEA State Convention.  Bands under Houser’s direction also performed at Chicago Bears Games, the Hollywood Christmas Parade, the Indianapolis 500 Parade, the Outback Bowl Parade and Half-Time Show, the Target Thanksgiving Day Parade, the Washington DC National Memorial Parade, as well as included performances with Maynard Ferguson and the Dallas Brass.

Houser is also the Director and Head Clinician for the Smith Walbridge Clinics, one of the largest marching band/leadership camps of its type in the United States.

Early years, education, and personal life 
Houser grew up in North Liberty, Indiana and attended John Glenn High School in Walkerton, Indiana.  Instead of studying law at a college in the Midwest as his parents had initially wished, Houser chose to spend his undergraduate years at the University of Florida, where he would go on to major in music education and perform as a trumpet player and eventually drum major of the Gator Marching Band.

After starting his teaching career in public high schools, in 2007 Houser decided to go back to school and was a student of James Keene and Pete Griffin at the University of Illinois, where he pursued a master's degree in wind band conducting.  While a student at Illinois, Houser served as a graduate assistant where he conducted athletic bands and assisted with directing the Marching Illini, the band over which he would eventually assume full leadership a few years later.

In 2007, Houser married Abigail Dobies.

Career

Eastern Illinois University (2008-2011) 
Houser began his collegiate band directing career at Eastern Illinois University in Charleston, Illinois where he served as the Associate Director of Bands and Director of Athletic Bands.  The Eastern Illinois University Marching Panthers was the first college marching band Houser directed.

University of Illinois Marching Illini (2011-present) 
After a last-minute resignation of director Pete Griffin, the University of Illinois began their summer search for a new director of the University of Illinois Marching Illini, the marching band that is part of the nation’s first collegiate band program.  This search ultimately resulted in the hiring of Houser, who would now return to lead the program he had served as a graduate assistant for just three years before.

During Houser’s first five years as a faculty member at the University of Illinois, the band grew to a record-size of 375 members.  Under Houser’s direction, the band has performed at Chicago Bears home football games; an It's On Us rally held by Vice President Joe Biden; the Dublin St. Patrick’s Day Parade; and many other events separate and apart from athletic events at the University.  The band’s most notable performance during Houser’s first five years at Illinois was during the 2015 Macy’s Thanksgiving Day Parade.  The band was selected to perform in the preeminent position at the end of the parade bringing in Santa Claus.  Houser had previously co-directed the Macy's Great-American Marching Band for many years, and therefore had experience preparing for the unique performance at Herald Square.

2015 Ohio State Recruitment 
In April 2015, it became known that the Ohio State University was actively recruiting Houser to serve as the director of their marching band.  Despite his participation in the interview process, and finalist-status, Houser ultimately made the decision to remain at the University of Illinois.  In an interview about Houser's choice to stay, Jeff Magee, the director of University of Illinois’ School of Music described Houser as a “pillar” of the Illinois Bands program.

"Pay It Forward" Initiative 
In addition to the work that the band does on the field, Houser believes the band can and should use its fame and manpower to help give back to the community.  During his time at the university, the band has taken on numerous causes and held unique fundraisers, most notably the "Sousaphone 5K."  After the first year the race was held, Houser agreed to run the 5K the following year while wearing a sousaphone if the band raised $5000 in an effort to generate additional hype and create an incentive that would help raise more money.  Another notable charitable endeavor during Houser's time at the university was the piccolo section's participation in a dance marathon.

Smith Walbridge Clinics 
In addition to his responsibilities at the University of Illinois, Houser is also the President of the Smith Walbridge Drum Major Clinics.  Houser first joined the staff in 1995 and eventually was named president. Smith Walbridge is the oldest camp of its kind and draws students from all across the country, and around the world every summer.

Macy's Great American Marching Band
Houser has been selected to conduct the Macy's Great American Marching Band six times.

References

Living people
1977 births
University of Illinois Urbana-Champaign people
University of Florida alumni
American bandleaders
Eastern Illinois University people